B'z The Best "Pleasure" is the third compilation album by the Japanese rock duo B'z and released in 1998. It includes many of the group's hit singles from 1989 to 1998. With the exception of "Be There", all the songs are #1 hits on the Oricon charts.

The album reached 1st at Oricon with more than 2.7 million copies sold in its first week, and topped the charts for more three weeks. It sold more than 5 million copies in 1998 alone, making it the best-selling album in Japanese music history during its release, until being surpassed by Hikaru Utada's First Love in 1999.

Track listing
Love Phantom - 4:39
Love Me, I Love You - 3:20
Easy Come, Easy Go! - 4:40
Zero - 4:50
Alone - 6:00
 - 4:26
Ai no mama ni Wagamama ni Boku wa Kimi dake wo Kizutsukenai (愛のままにわがままに 僕は君だけを傷つけない) -  3:56
Lady Navigation - 4:20
Taiyo no Komachi Angel (太陽のKomachi Angel) - 4:10
Be There - 4:13
Don't Leave Me - 4:24
Bad Communication E.Style　- 4:19
Calling - 5:56
Samayoeru Aoi Dangan (さまよえる蒼い弾丸) - 4:05

Tracks 1, 2, 12 from the album Loose. Track 3 from Risky. Track 4 from Run. Track 5 from In the Life. Tracks 8, 11 from The 7th Blues. Track 13 from Survive.

Certifications

References

External links 
B'z official website

B'z compilation albums
1998 compilation albums